Transverse metacarpal ligament can refer to:
 Deep transverse metacarpal ligament
 Superficial transverse metacarpal ligament